The grand tour of France was a royal progress around France by Charles IX of France, set up by his mother Catherine de Medici to show him his kingdom, which had just been ravaged by the first of the French Wars of Religion. It set off from Paris on 24 January 1564 (a year after he reached his legal majority) and returned there on 1 May 1566. Accompanied by his family and Catherine as queen-mother, the king covered nearly 4000 kilometres around the remotest border areas of the kingdom, starting in the east, running along the eastern frontier as far as Provence before turning west, reaching the Atlantic Ocean in Gascony, then moving back up the Loire valley and finishing in the Bourbonnais.

His entourage was around 15,000 strong, including a military escort, his privy council, servants carrying his tapestries, coffers and other furniture, artisans, princes and ambassadors. It was a staged display of royal power in the wake of the first war of religion, to compensate for the throne's weakness in the provinces and to forge the kingdom's unity around himself by strengthening ties of loyalty to the monarchy. On each leg of the journey his fore-runners had a rush to find lodgings for him - in the large towns he slept in the town-house of that city's richest citizen (who had to move out during the king's stay), but more often he slept in inns. Finding lodgings was a real problem, for the court accompanying him and his family was made up of several thousand people, with its major lords each using their agents to find lodgings before anyone else - in short, first come, first served. Many lords thus had to sleep outside wherever the king lodged.

Aims

Legs

Champagne and the duchy of Lorraine

Burgundy

The Lyonnais and the Dauphiné

The Comtat Venaissin and Provence

Languedoc

Guyenne

Angoumois, Saintonge, Aunis and Poitou

Loire Valley and Brittany

The Bourbonnais and the Auvergne

Return to Paris

Summary

Sources and bibliography

References

French Wars of Religion
Parades in Europe